Aerovías de Integración Regional S.A. (Acronym: AIRES, lit. airs), d/b/a LATAM Airlines Colombia (formerly known as LAN Colombia) is a Colombian airline. It is the second-largest air carrier in Colombia after Avianca. It operates scheduled regional domestic passenger services, as well as a domestic cargo service. Its main hub is El Dorado International Airport in Bogotá.

History

The airline was founded on October 2, 1980, starting operations on February 23, 1981, with a few small planes, until they acquired some Embraer 110 Bandeirante and Fairchild F27. In 1990, the airline registered a 9% decrease in passenger transport.

With the rise of competition with AeroRepública in November 1992, AIRES made small expansions, mostly adding service to the neighboring countries of Venezuela and Ecuador.

In November 1998, the airline began its coverage in the Caribbean Region, opening a base of operations in Barranquilla, from where flights began to: Cartagena, Santa Marta, Valledupar, Corozal among other cities in the north of the country.

On December 13, 2000, the airline began its internationalization with the opening of the Barranquilla-Oranjestad, Aruba route, flying twice a week, later it began operations to Willemstad, Curaçao.

In 2004, the company made a corporate image change, as well as the change in the stationery, said investment had a cost of close to 1,000 million pesos.

In 2009, with the beginning of the trunk routes, a new era began and thus rubbed shoulders with Avianca and Copa Airlines Colombia, and this was done by incorporating Jet aircraft and breaking the tariff scheme by becoming a low-cost airline.

On October 28, 2010, it was announced that 98% of the shares in the previous airline AIRES had been acquired by Chilean carrier LAN Airlines. On November 26, 2010, LAN Airlines announced that it completed the purchase of 98.9% of AIRES' shares, assuming its total debt and including it in the LAN holding company as a subsidiary of the group. On December 3, 2011, AIRES was renamed and started operations as LAN Colombia, becoming a member of the aeronautical holding LATAM Airlines Group.

It became an affiliate member of the Oneworld alliance on October 1, 2013, but left on May 1, 2020.

Destinations

Fleet

Current fleet

, LATAM Colombia's fleet consists of the following aircraft:

Former fleet
The airline previously operated the following aircraft:

Accidents and incidents
On August 14, 1995, AIRES Flight 413, an Embraer EMB 110 Bandeirante (registered HK-2594), crashed into a mountain of the Nevado del Huila, Colombia. All 6 passengers and 2 pilots were killed.
On February 20, 2002, a Bombardier Dash 8-300 (registered HK-3951X), en route from Neiva to Bogotá, was hijacked by 4 brigands, forcing them to land in a town and kidnapped a senator who was on board.
On January 28, 2008, AIRES Flight 053, Bombardier Dash 8-200 (registered HK-3997), overran the runway at El Dorado International Airport, en route from Maracaibo, Venezuela after the left gear collapsed. The probable cause of the crash was that the aircraft was carrying out a landing with an unresolved fault in the left engine, which prevented the aircraft from being able to stop within the length of runway available, causing a runway excursion. A contributing factor was the failure to correct the maintenance reports in a satisfactory manner and failure to properly follow-up on repetitive entries. None of the 41 occupants were injured. The aircraft was substantially damaged and written off.
On August 23, 2008, AIRES Flight 051, a Bombardier Dash 8-300 (registered HK-3952), sustained substantial damage after the right hand main landing gear collapsed on landing at Ernesto Cortissoz International Airport. The crew noticed a vibration of the right gear. None of the 31 occupants were injured. The aircraft was damaged beyond repair and written off.
On August 16, 2010, AIRES Flight 8250 crashed on landing at Gustavo Rojas Pinilla International Airport, in San Andrés, Colombia, after reportedly being struck by lightning during a thunderstorm. The death of one person was reported as a result of a heart attack on the way to the hospital and another 129 were injured. One of the injured occupants later died. The cause was later determined to be pilot error.
On March 29, 2022, LATAM Colombia Flight 4292, an Airbus A320-200 (registered CC-BAS) bound for Rafael Núñez International Airport in Cartagena, had to return and make an emergency landing at José María Córdova International Airport in Medellin after its nosewheel was rotated ninety degrees shortly after takeoff, all the passengers and crew were unharmed.

See also
List of airlines of Colombia

References

External links

 Conexión (inflight magazine)
 LAN Airlines buys Aires

Airlines of Colombia
Colombia
Former Oneworld affiliate members
Latin American and Caribbean Air Transport Association
Airlines established in 1980